Carmen Maarman (born 7 November 1978), is a South African actress and voice-over artist. She is best known for the roles in the television serials such as; Lui Maar Op, Belinda, Arendsvlei and Skemerdans.

Personal life
Maarman was born on 7 November 1978 in South Africa.

Career
In 2000, she made television debut with the e.tv youth soap opera Backstage. In the soap opera, she played the cameo role as "Shy Girl". Then in 2004, she appeared in the SABC1 drama Interrogation Room with a minor role. In 2010, he appeared in the serial Deeltitel Dames. In the meantime, she rendered her voice in the dubbing of the Turkish telenovela Gebroke Harte into Afrikaans language. In 2018, she played the role "Cheryl" in the critically acclaimed award winning film Ellen: Die storie van Ellen Pakkies directed by Daryne Joshua. In 2019, she made the her first television lead role as "Maggie" in the kykNET sitcom Lui Maar Op, Belinda, where she reprised the role in second season as well. Meanwhile, she also performed in theatre circles such as "Aunty Merle The Musical" and played the role as "Sureya Samsodien". Later in the year, she joined with the fourth season of kykNET soap opera Getroud met rugby and played the role "Zelda".

Then in 2020, she appeared in the third season of the kykNET & Kie soap opera Arendsvlei with the supportive role of "Natalie". In that year, she also acted in the kykNET police procedural serial Projek Dina by playing the role "Tasneem". In 2021, she appeared in two television serials: as "Kelly van Rensburg" in the SABC2 telenovela Die Sentrum and as "Bonita Fortune" in the kykNET & kie mystery thriller Skemerdans.

Apart from cinema and television, she has performed in many theatre plays such as; District Six, The Kramer Petersen Songbook, The Ugly Duckling, Ghoema and Pinocchio.

Filmography

References

External links
 IMDb

1978 births
Living people
South African film actresses
South African television actresses
South African stage actresses